Edwin T. Dahlberg (27 December 1892 – September 1986) was an American Baptist church leader. He was known for his strong efforts to promote social justice and peacemaking.

Biography
The Reverend Edwin T. Dahlberg was President of American Baptist Churches USA, (1946–1947) and President of the National Council of Churches USA (1957–1960). He helped found the Fellowship of Reconciliation and the Baptist Peace Fellowship.  He advocated pacifism during World War II, the Korean War and the Vietnam War, ultimately receiving the Gandhi Peace Award. A graduate of Colgate Rochester Divinity School, he later served as trustee of his alma mater.

American Baptist Churches USA named the   Dahlberg Peace Award after pastor Dahlberg. In 1964 Martin Luther King Jr. was the first recipient.

Selected works
Youth and the Homes of Tomorrow (1942)
The Book of Revival (1951)
In the Unity of the Faith (1960)
This is the rim of East Asia (1962)
Herald of Evangel;: 60 years of American Christianity (1965)

Quote

References

Other sources
Dahlberg, Keith  Edwin T. Dahlberg, Pastor, Peacemaker, Prophet (Valley Forge, Pennsylvania: Judson Press 1998)

External links
National Council of Churches Presidents
Dahlberg Peace Award

1892 births
1986 deaths
American Christian writers
American pacifists
Colgate Rochester Crozer Divinity School alumni
Place of birth missing
20th-century Baptist ministers from the United States